Jaakko Sakari Simelius (13 November 1900, Kuopio – 18 May 1985, Helsinki) was a Finnish General of the Infantry. He was the Chief of Defence of the Finnish Defence Forces between 1959 and 1965.

External links
The Finnish Defence Forces: Chiefs of Defence  

1900 births
1985 deaths
People from Kuopio
People from Kuopio Province (Grand Duchy of Finland)
Chiefs of Staff (Finnish Defence Forces)
Finnish generals
People of the Finnish Civil War (White side)
Finnish military personnel of World War II